In 2021, an internal document leak from the company then known as Facebook (now Meta Platforms, or Meta) showed it was aware of harmful societal effects from its platforms. The leak, released by whistleblower Frances Haugen, resulted in reporting from The Wall Street Journal in September, as The Facebook Files series, as well as the Facebook Papers, by a consortium of news outlets the next month.

Primarily, the reports proved that based on internally commissioned studies, the company was fully aware of negative impact on teenage users of Instagram, and the contribution of Facebook activity to violence in developing countries. Other takeaways of the leak include the impact of the company's platforms on spreading false information and promoting anger-provoking posts.
Furthermore, harmful content had been known to be pushed through Facebook algorithms reaching young users. The type of content included anorexia posts and self harm photos.

In October 2021, Whistleblower Aid filed eight anonymous whistleblower complaints with the U.S. Securities and Exchange Commission (SEC) on behalf of Haugen alleging securities fraud by the company after Haugen leaked the company documents the previous month. After publicly revealing her identity on 60 Minutes, Haugen testified before the U.S. Senate Commerce Subcommittee on Consumer Protection, Product Safety, and Data Security about the content of the leaked documents and the complaints. After the company renamed itself as Meta Platforms, Whistleblower Aid filed two additional securities fraud complaints with the SEC against the company on behalf of Haugen in February 2022.

Background 

In mid September 2021, The Wall Street Journal began publishing articles on Facebook based on internal documents from unknown provenance. Revelations included reporting of special allowances on posts from high-profile users ("XCheck"), subdued responses to flagged information on human traffickers and drug cartels, a shareholder lawsuit concerning the cost of Facebook (now Meta) CEO Mark Zuckerberg's personal liability protection in resolving the Cambridge Analytica data scandal, an initiative to increase pro-Facebook news within user news feeds, and internal knowledge of how Instagram exacerbated negative self-image in surveyed teenage girls.

Siva Vaidhyanathan wrote for The Guardian that the documents were from a team at Facebook "devoted to social science and data analytics that is supposed to help the company's leaders understand the consequences of their policies and technological designs." Casey Newton of The Verge wrote that it is the company's biggest challenge since its Cambridge Analytica data scandal.

The leaked documents include internal research from Facebook that studied the impact of Instagram on teenage mental health. Although Facebook earlier claimed that its rules applies equally to everyone on the platform, internal documents shared with The Wall Street Journal point to special policy exceptions reserved for VIP users, including celebrities and politicians. After this reporting, Facebook's oversight board said it would review the system.

On October 3, 2021, the former Facebook employee behind the leak, Frances Haugen, revealed her identity on 60 Minutes.

The reports 

Beginning October 22, a group of news outlets began publishing articles based on documents provided by Haugen's lawyers, collectively referred to as The Facebook Papers.

Instagram's effects on teenagers 
The Files show that Facebook (now Meta) has been conducting internal research of how Instagram affects young users for the past three years. While the findings point to Instagram being harmful to a large portion of young users, teenage girls were among the most harmed. Researchers within the company reported that "we make body issues worse for one in three teenage girls". Furthermore, internal research revealed that teen boys were also affected by negative social comparison, citing 14% of boys in the US in 2019. Instagram was concluded to contribute to problems more specific to its app use, such as social comparison among teens. Facebook published some of its internal research on September 29, 2021, saying these reports mischaracterized the purpose and results of its research.

Studying of preteens 
The Files show that Facebook formed a team to study preteens, set a three year goal to create more products for this demographic, and commissioned strategy papers about the long-term business prospects of attracting the preteen demographic. A 2020 document from Facebook states: "Why do we care about tweens?" and answers that question by saying that "They are a valuable but untapped audience."

Violence in developing countries 
An internal memo seen by the Washington Post revealed that Facebook has been aware of hate speech and calls for violence against groups like Muslims and Kashmiris, including posts of photos of piles of dead Kashmiri bodies with glorifying captions on its platform in India. Still, none of their publishers were blocked. Documents reveal Facebook has responded to these incidents by removing posts which violate their policy, but has not made any substantial efforts to prevent repeat offenses. As 90% of monthly Facebook users are now located outside of the US and Canada, Facebook claims language barriers are one obstacle that is preventing widespread reform.

Controlling falsehoods about the 2020 U.S. elections 
The New York Times pointed to internal discussions where employees raised concerns that Facebook was spreading content about the QAnon conspiracy theory more than a year before the 2020 United States elections. After the election, a data scientist mentioned in an internal note that 10 percent of all U.S. views of political content were of posts alleging that the election was fraudulent.

Promoting anger-provoking posts 
In 2015, in addition to the Like button on posts, Facebook introduced a set of other emotional reaction options: love, haha, yay, wow, sad and angry. The Washington Post reported that for three years, Facebook's algorithms promoted posts that received the 'angry' reaction from its users, based on internal analysis showing that such posts lead to five times more engagement than posts with regular likes. Years later, Facebook's researchers pointed out that posts with 'angry' reactions were much more likely to be toxic, polarizing, fake or low quality.

In 2018, Facebook overhauled its News Feed algorithm, implementing a new algorithm which favored "Meaningful Social Interations" or "MSI". The new algorithm increased the weight of reshared material - a move which aimed to "reverse the decline in comments and encourage more original posting". While the algorithm was successful in its efforts, consequences such as user reports of feed quality decreasing along with increased anger on the site were observed. Leaked documents reveal that employees presented several potential changes to fix some of the highlighted issues with their algorithm. However, documents claim Mark Zuckerberg denied the proposed changes due to his worry that they might cause less users to engage with Facebook. Documents have also pointed to another 2019 study conducted by Facebook where a fake account based in India was created and studied to see what type of content it was presented and interacted with. Results of the study showed that within three weeks, the fake account's newsfeed was being presented pornography and "filled with polarizing and graphic content, hate speech and misinformation", according to an internal company report.

Employee dissatisfaction 
Politico quotes several Facebook staff expressing concerns about the company's willingness and ability to respond to damage caused by the platform. A 2020 post reads: "It's not normal for a large number of people in the 'make the site safe' team to leave saying, 'hey, we're actively making the world worse FYI.' Every time this gets raised it gets shrugged off with 'hey people change jobs all the time' but this is NOT normal."

Apple's threat to remove Facebook and Instagram 
In 2019, following concerns about Facebook and Instagram being used to trade maids in the Middle East, Apple threatened to remove their iOS apps from the App Store.

XCheck 
The documents have shown a private program known as "XCheck" or "cross-check" that Facebook has employed in order to whitelist posts from users deemed as "high-profile". The system began as a quality control measure but has since grown to protect "millions of VIP users from the company's normal enforcement process". XCheck has led to celebrities and other public figures being exempt from punishment that the average Facebook user would receive from violating policies. In 2019, football player Neymar had posted nude photos of a woman who had accused him of rape which were left up for more than a day. According to The Wall Street Journal, "XCheck grew to include at least 5.8 million users in 2020" according to Facebook's internal documents. The goal of XCheck was "to never publicly tangle with anyone who is influential enough to do you harm".

Collaboration on censorship with the government of Vietnam 
In 2020, Vietnam's communist government has threatened to shut down Facebook if the social media company does not co-operate on censoring political content in the country, Meta's (then known as Facebook) big market in Southeast Asia. The decision to comply was personally approved by Mark Zuckerberg.

Suppression of political movements on its platform 
In 2021, Facebook developed a new strategy for addressing harmful content on their site, implementing measures which were designed to reduce and suppress the spread of movements that were deemed hateful. According to a senior security official at Facebook, the company "would seek to disrupt on-platform movements only if there was compelling evidence that they were the product of tightly knit circles of users connected to real-world violence or other harm and committed to violating Facebook's rules". As part of their recently coordinated initiative, this included less promotion of the movement's posts within users' News Feed as well as not notifying users of new posts from these pages. Specific groups that have been highlighted as being affected by Facebook's social harm policy include the Patriot Party, previously linked to the Capitol attack, as well as a newer German conspiracy group known as Querdenken, who had been placed under surveillance by German intelligence after protests it organized repeatedly "resulted in violence and injuries to the police".

Facebook's AI concern 
According to The Wall Street Journal, documents show that in 2019, Facebook reduced the time spent by human reviewers on hate-speech complaints, shifting towards a stronger dependence on their artificial intelligence systems to regulate the matter. However, internal documents from employees claim that their AI has been largely unsuccessful, seeing trouble detecting videos of cars crashing, cockfighting, as well as understanding hate speech in foreign languages. Internal engineers and researchers within Facebook have estimated that their AI has only been able to detect and remove 0.6% of "all content that violated Facebook's policies against violence and incitement".

The Wall Street Journal podcast 
For The Facebook Files series of reports, The Wall Street Journal produced a podcast on its The Journal channel, divided into eight episodes:
 Part 1: The Whitelist
 Part 2: 'We Make Body Image Issues Worse'
 Part 3: 'This Shouldn't Happen on Facebook'
 Part 4: The Outrage Algorithm
 Part 5: The Push To Attract Younger Users
 Part 6: The Whistleblower
 Part 7: The AI Challenge
 Part 8: A New Enforcement Strategy

Facebook's response 
In the Q3 2021 earnings call, Facebook CEO Mark Zuckerberg discussed the recent leaks, characterizing them as coordinated efforts to paint a false picture of his company by selectively leaking documents.

According to a leaked internal email seen by The New York Times, Facebook asked its employees to "preserve internal documents and communications since 2016", a practice called a legal hold. The email continues: "As is often the case following this kind of reporting, a number of inquiries from governments and legislative bodies have been launched into the company's operations."

Lobbying 
In December 2021, news broke on The Wall Street Journal pointing to Meta's lobbying efforts to divide US lawmakers and "muddy the waters" in Congress, to hinder regulation following the 2021 whistleblower leaks. Facebook's lobbyist team in Washington suggested to Republican lawmakers that the whistleblower "was trying to help Democrats," while the narrative told to Democratic staffers was that Republicans "were focused on the company's decision to ban expressions of support for Kyle Rittenhouse," The Wall Street Journal reported. According to the article, the company's goal was to "muddy the waters, divide lawmakers along partisan lines and forestall a cross-party alliance" against Facebook (now Meta) in Congress.

See also 
 Criticism of Facebook
 Comparison of user features of messaging platforms
 Instagram's impact on people
 Problematic social media use
 Twitter Files

References

Further reading 

 A whistleblower's power: Key takeaways from the Facebook Papers (WaPo, October 25, 2021)
 The Facebook Papers and their fallout. (NYT, October 25, 2021)
 ‘HISTORY WILL NOT JUDGE US KINDLY' (Adrienne LaFrance, Atlantic, October 25, 2021)
 The Facebook Papers: Documents reveal internal fury and dissent over site's policies (NBC News, October 25, 2021)
 Not stopping 'Stop the Steal:' Facebook Papers paint damning picture of company's role in insurrection (CNN, October 24, 2021)
 Facebook documents offer a treasure trove for Washington's antitrust war (Politico, October 25, 2021) 
 Here are all the Facebook Papers stories (Protocol)

External links 
  (The Facebook Files, The Wall Street Journal)
 

News leaks
Facebook criticisms and controversies
Corporate scandals
2021 scandals